In geometry, the compass equivalence theorem is an important statement in compass and straightedge constructions. The tool advocated by Plato in these constructions is a divider or collapsing compass, that is, a compass that "collapses" whenever it is lifted from a page, so that it may not be directly used to transfer distances. The modern compass with its fixable aperture can be used to transfer distances directly and so appears to be a more powerful instrument. However, the compass equivalence theorem states that any construction via a "modern compass" may be attained with a collapsing compass. This can be shown by establishing that with a collapsing compass, given a circle in the plane, it is possible to construct another circle of equal radius, centered at any given point on the plane. This theorem is Proposition II of Book I of Euclid's Elements. The proof of this theorem has had a chequered history.

Construction

The following construction and proof of correctness are given by Euclid in his Elements. Although there appear to be several cases in Euclid's treatment, depending upon choices made when interpreting ambiguous instructions, they all lead to the same conclusion, and so, specific choices are given below.

They will intersect at point  and form the equilateral triangle .
Because  is an equilateral triangle, .
Therefore, .
Because  is on the circle , .
Therefore, .

Alternative construction without straightedge 
It is possible to prove compass equivalence without the use of the straightedge.
This justifies the use of "fixed compass" moves (constructing a circle of a given radius at a different location) in proofs of the Mohr–Mascheroni theorem, which states that any construction possible with straightedge and compass can be accomplished with compass alone.

Label their other intersection .
Draw a circle (the green circle) with center  passing through . This is the required circle.

There are several proofs of the correctness of this construction and it is often left as an exercise for the reader. Here is a modern one using transformations.

Thus  is the reflection of  through line .
By construction,  is the reflection of  through line .
Since reflection is an isometry, it follows that  as desired.

References

Compass and straightedge constructions